Francois Geldenhuys (born 31 December 1982) is a South African cricketer. He played in one first-class and one List A match for Boland in 2006.

See also
 List of Boland representative cricketers

References

External links
 

1982 births
Living people
South African cricketers
Boland cricketers
People from Polokwane